Pterostylis bryophila, commonly known as the Hindmarsh Valley greenhood, is a species of orchid endemic to South Australia. As with similar greenhoods, plants in flower differ from those that are not. In this species, plants not in flower have a rosette of leaves lying flat on the ground, but those in flower have a single small, shiny, bright green and white flower with a protruding, platform-like sinus between the lateral sepals.

Description
The flowers are shiny, bright green and white and curve forwards. The dorsal sepal and petals are fused, forming a hood or "galea" over the column, the dorsal sepal pointed and longer than the petals. Flowering occurs from April to July.

Taxonomy and naming
Pterostylis bryophila was first formally described in 1997 by David Jones from a specimen collected near the Hindmarsh Valley Reservoir. The description was published in The Orchadian.

Distribution and habitat
The Hindmarsh Valley greenhood grows in moist, shady places in grassy woodland and forest.

Conservation
Pterostylis bryophila is listed as "critically endangered" (CR) under the Environment Protection and Biodiversity Conservation Act 1999 (EPBC Act). The main threats to the species are habitat disturbance, grazing by kangaroos and rabbits (Oryctolagus cuniculus), inappropriate fire regimes and weed invasion.

References

bryophila
Endemic orchids of Australia
Orchids of South Australia
Plants described in 1997